Apogee is a type of apsis: an extreme point in an object's orbit.

Apogee may also refer to:

Companies
 Apogee Books, an imprint of Canadian publishing house Collector's Guide Publishing
 Apogee Electronics, a manufacturer of digital audio hardware systems
 Apogee Software, a video game publisher and developer now known as 3D Realms
 Apogee Entertainment, a video game publisher that acquired the rights to the name and logo from 3D Realms
 Apogee, Inc., a special effects company established by John Dykstra

Fictional characters
 Apogee, a superhero from The Incredibles
 Talwyn Apogee, a character in the Ratchet & Clank series

Music
 Apogee (Bongzilla album) (2000)
 Apogee (Pete Christlieb and Warne Marsh album) (1978)

Other uses
 Apogee Stadium, an American football venue of the University of North Texas
 Apache Point Observatory Galactic Evolution Experiment, an astronomical survey

See also
Perigee (disambiguation)